Korakkattur is a small village which in Gobichettipalayam taluk, Erode district. Korakkattur is also called Korakkattupudur. This place comes under two panchayats which are Vellankovil and Kadukkampalayam. The village is also split between two MLA constituencies, Gobichettipalayam and Anthiyur.

The Kariya Kalli Amman Kovil and Lord Shiva, Vishnu, Hanuman temple usually conducts a festival in February or March. There is also a Mariamman Temple located at this village which holds a seven-day festival in May. 

Korakkattur village is mainly dependent on agriculture, producing sugar cane, turmeric, rice, and other produce. The main water source is the LBP canal.

Villages in Erode district